The Newport Southbank Bridge, popularly known as the Purple People Bridge, stretches 2,670 feet over the Ohio River, connecting Newport, Kentucky to downtown Cincinnati, Ohio.

History

The original bridge first opened on April 1, 1872, under the name Newport and Cincinnati Bridge, and was Cincinnati's first railroad bridge spanning the Ohio River.  The bridge piers were built with stone from Adams County, Ohio. The present bridge, which was built on the original piers (which were widened during that work), opened in 1897 to streetcar, pedestrian and automobile traffic.

In 1904, the bridge was renamed the L&N (Louisville and Nashville) Railroad Bridge, and this name remained until the bridge was rehabilitated and re-opened as a pedestrian-only bridge in May 2003.

The bridge was closed to railroad traffic in 1987, and later closed to automobile traffic in October 2001 after years of neglect and deterioration.

On April 17, 2001, the L&N Railroad Bridge was listed on the National Register of Historic Places.

In late 2001, the city of Newport, Kentucky, and Southbank Partners, an economic development group, used $4 million in state funds to restore the bridge.  When it was time to decide on what color to paint it, a variety of options were explored.  Computer-generated images of the bridge were shown to participants in more than a dozen focus groups, all of whom picked the color purple as a top choice.  It was soon coined the "Purple People Bridge" by area residents.

The bridge provides convenient access to the "Newport on the Levee" development in Newport, Kentucky, as well as Downtown Cincinnati.

In 2006, it became possible for the public to cross the bridge via its superstructure wearing appropriate safety gear.  There are similar bridge climb experiences in Australia and New Zealand. Citing lack of funds and low attendance, the Purple People Bridge Climb closed on May 23, 2007.

The bridge remains open to pedestrian and bicycle traffic.

Gallery

See also
List of crossings of the Ohio River

References

External links

Early bridge photograph circa 1910 from the Cincinnati Memory project
Louisville & Nashville RR Bridge at Cincinnati Transit
Meet the Purple People Bridge at the Cincinnati Enquirer
Newport Southbank Bridge at Bridges & Tunnels
Purple People Bridge at Nikibone
L&N Cincinnati-Newport Railroad Bridge at BridgeHunter

Bridges completed in 1872
Bridges completed in 1897
Railroad bridges on the National Register of Historic Places in Kentucky
Railroad bridges on the National Register of Historic Places in Ohio
Road bridges on the National Register of Historic Places in Kentucky
Road bridges on the National Register of Historic Places in Ohio
Bridges in Cincinnati
Louisville and Nashville Railroad
Newport, Kentucky
Bridges over the Ohio River
National Register of Historic Places in Campbell County, Kentucky
National Register of Historic Places in Cincinnati
Truss bridges in the United States
Former road bridges in the United States
Former railway bridges in the United States
Road-rail bridges in the United States
Pedestrian bridges in Kentucky
Pedestrian bridges in Ohio
Transportation in Campbell County, Kentucky
Rail trail bridges in the United States
Rail trails in Kentucky
Rail trails in Ohio
1872 establishments in Ohio
1872 establishments in Kentucky
1897 establishments in Ohio
1897 establishments in Kentucky